François Gangloff (11 July 1898 – 16 March 1979) was a French gymnast and Olympic medalist. He competed at the 1924 Summer Olympics in Paris, where he received a silver medal in sidehorse vault, and a silver medal and in team combined exercises.

References

French male artistic gymnasts
Gymnasts at the 1924 Summer Olympics
Olympic gymnasts of France
Olympic silver medalists for France
1898 births
1979 deaths
Olympic medalists in gymnastics
Medalists at the 1924 Summer Olympics
20th-century French people